SS Owen Wister was a Liberty ship built in the United States during World War II. She was named after Owen Wister, an American writer and historian, considered the "father" of western fiction. He is best remembered for writing The Virginian and a biography of Ulysses S. Grant.

Construction
Owen Wister was laid down on 2 November 1943, under a Maritime Commission (MARCOM) contract, MC hull 1216, by the St. Johns River Shipbuilding Company, Jacksonville, Florida; she was sponsored by Mrs. William L. Marshall, the wife of Gulf Coast Regional construction auditor for MARCOM, and was launched on 14 December 1943.

History
She was allocated to William J. Rountree Company, on 24 December 1943. On 22 July 1949, she was laid up in the National Defense Reserve Fleet, Astoria, Oregon. On 28 June 1954, she was withdrawn from the fleet to be loaded with grain under the "Grain Program 1954", she returned loaded on 17 July 1954. On 3 November 1956, she was withdrawn to be unload, she returned on empty 9 November 1956. She was removed from the fleet on 21 December 1964.

References

Bibliography

 
 
 
 

 

Liberty ships
Ships built in Jacksonville, Florida
1943 ships
Astoria Reserve Fleet
Astoria Reserve Fleet Grain Program